The 2015–16 Ekstraklasa was the 82nd season of the highest level of football leagues in Poland since its establishment in 1927. A total of 16 teams were participating, 14 of which competed in the league during the 2014–15 season, while the remaining two were promoted from the I Liga. Each team played a total of 37 matches, half at home and half away.

Lech Poznań were the defending champions, having won their 7th title last season.

Teams
Promotion and relegation as usual was determined by the position in the table from prior season. The bottom two teams were directly relegated to the I Liga, while the top two teams are promoted to the Ekstraklasa.

Zawisza Bydgoszcz and GKS Bełchatów finished in 15th and 16th place, respectively, and were relegated to the I Liga as a result. Zagłębie Lubin, the 2014–15 I Liga champion, returns to the top level just one year after their relegation. Runners-up Termalica Bruk-Bet Nieciecza was promoted to the Ekstraklasa for the first time.

Stadium and locations

 Termalica played 7 first home games at Stadion MOSiR (cap. 6,864) in Mielec.

Personnel and kits

Managerial changes

Regular season

League table

Positions by round

Results

Play-offs

Championship round

League table

Positions by round

Results

Relegation round

League table

Positions by round

Results

Season statistics

Top goalscorers

Top assists

Attendances

Awards

Annual awards

References

External links
  
Ekstraklasa at uefa.com

2015-16
Pol
1